appear in Lafcadio Hearn's Kwaidan: Stories and Studies of Strange Things (1904) as corpse-eating spirits. In Japanese Buddhism, jikininki ("human-eating ghosts"; pronounced shokujinki in modern Japanese), are similar to Gaki/Hungry ghost; the spirits of greedy, selfish or impious individuals who are cursed after death to seek out and eat humans and human corpses. 

The supernatural species known as Jijinki (or Phantasm) is the byproduct of a pregnant woman outsmarting a corpse-eater. A similar story can be found as "Aozukin" in Ueda Akinari's Ugetsu Monogatari from 1776.

Story
It is said that there was a monk/priest, named Muso, who was traveling alone through the mountains in the Mino prefecture of Japan, when he lost his way.  It was almost dark when he saw, up on a hill, an old , the home of solitary priests.  He walked to the top of the hill and asked the inhabitant if he could stay the night. The only inhabitant was an old priest, who harshly refused Muso lodgings for the night; however, he told Muso that he could find food and a place to sleep down in a hamlet, nearby.  

Muso found the hamlet, where the headman welcomed him and promptly supplied him food and a place to sleep. A little before midnight that night, Muso was awakened by a young man, one of the villagers, who informed him that, earlier that day, before Muso had arrived, that his father had died.  The young man had not told Muso earlier so he would not feel embarrassed or obliged to participate in ceremonies.  However, the entire village was now leaving their homes for a nearby village, as it was custom to leave the corpse alone for the night or-else bad things would befall the village inhabitants.  As a priest, Muso told the young man he would do his duty and perform the burial services and stay the night with the corpse.  He was not afraid of the demons or evil spirits the young man spoke of.  

When the young man and the other villagers had left, Muso knelt by the corpse and the offerings and began the service.  In the deepest part of the night, a shapeless being entered, while Muso was deep in meditation.  Muso could not speak or move as he watched the shapeless being devour the corpse and the offerings.  The next morning when the villagers had returned, Muso told the young man what had happened.  The young man was not surprised.  

Muso then asked the young man why the priest up on the nearby hill did not do the ceremony.  Confused, the young man told Muso that there was no priest who lived nearby and that there hadn't been for many years.  When Muso spoke of the Anjitsu, too, the young man also denied its existence, as-well.  Muso then departed from the village, now with proper directions to continue his journey.  

Although before he left area, Muso sought out the Anjitsu and the old priest living within it up-upon the top of the hill to see if he had indeed been mistaken.  He found the hill and Anjitsu easily, and the old priest let him inside this time.  The old priest then began to apologize for displaying his true form in front of Muso; he was none-other than the shapeless figure who had devoured the corpse in front of Muso the night-before.  The old priest went on-to explain that he was now a Jikininki and how he had come to be one; after living a long, selfish life as a priest, only caring about the food and clothes his services had brought him--even at the expense of others in more need of them then he had been--after his death, the old priest had been reborn into the world as a Jikininki, doomed to feed upon the fresh corpses of others.  The old priest then pleaded with Muso to perform a Segaki Requiem service for him, so that he could finally escape his horrible existence as a Jikininki.  As Muso performed the service, all of a sudden the old priest disappeared, along with the Anjitsu, too.  Muso found himself kneeling in the long grass upon the top of a hill before a tombstone of a priest and the ruins of the Anjitsu.

The story continues decades later when a young, pregnant, scholar runs into a Jikininki, during a day of wandering and studying. She was born of a spiritual father, who had given her a stone for protection, that which she had never believed in. To appease him, she kept it in a pouch with her writing charcoals, which she took everywhere in case she wanted to jot down her learnings in her travels. Although the stone was originally bright blue, it was now ashy black, having shared a pouch with the charcoals.

Despite not being a spiritual person, she believed what she could see with her own eyes. So when the Jikininki approached her, in that moment, her entire belief system of the mystical arts had shifted. The creature, able to taste the desires of others, knew this woman hungered knowledge. Aware that he could not make a meal of her with that stone on her person, he offered up knowledge in exchange for something of value, hoping she'd offer the stone.

Enticed by the prospect of learning something new, she indeed offered up the stone of protection. The Jikininki gladly agreed, but was frustrated when she pulled out parchment and charcoals, taking seat on a nearby boulder, ready to learn. "Come closer, I cannot shout the secrets I will share" The Jikininki whispered with little patience. And so with the stone in hand, he watched as she struggled to push herself off her makeshift seat,  finally approaching him.

When the young woman opened her closed fist, the Jikininki swatted at her hand, knocking what she held to the ground, and swallowed her whole. The corpse-eater searched the ground for the stone, but could not find it anywhere; the only thing out of place was a piece of writing charcoal. 

The Jikininki thought it was the clever one in this interaction, but back home this young woman was always known for being one step ahead. In fact, moments earlier when the corpse-eater believed she was struggling to stand up, she was just using that as a distraction to swallow the stone of protection and swap it with a piece of charcoal in her hand.

The Jikininki felt his insides tugging at him, until the pressure of the tugging was so strong, that he felt his body begin to shred. Piece by piece his entire being was ripped and absorbed into the stone of protection, which resided inside the young woman's belly. It was as if the young woman had swallowed the Jikininki instead. 

The woman went home, thankful for her father's superstitious beliefs, and eventually gave birth to healthy twins. She never did pass the stone, but always felt its presence in the pit of her stomach.

As her children grew older, they had gained a hefty appetite, and developed supernatural abilities that which they used to defend their village. Both could decipher what someone's soul "hungered," either through touch or by walking through someone's dream. Beyond that, one could taste the history of any person and/or object they touched; the other could digest the kinetic energy of people and/or objects.

The village people called them Jijinki, a nod to the creatures they descended from. On the outskirts of their village, some used the term Phantasm to describe them.

See also
 Gashadokuro
 Ghoul
 Hungry ghost

References

Buddhist legendary creatures
Japanese ghosts
Undead
Mythological monsters
Ghouls